The Ramón de Carranza Trophy is a pre-season football tournament organised by Cádiz City Hall, in memory of its former mayor, Ramón de Carranza – after whom the Cádiz F.C. stadium used to be named as well. Its 1962 final is widely known, as it was one of the first times in football history a tied game was resolved through a penalty shoot-out. Atlético de Madrid is the most successful club in the tournament history. Starting in 2019, it became a women's football tournament. With no match played in 2020 due to the COVID-19 pandemic in Spain, two editions (one for men and one for women) were played in August 2021.

It has been played annually in August since 1955, and is one of the most prestigious summer tournaments in Spain alongside the Teresa Herrera Trophy and the Colombino Trophy.

Titles by year

Titles by club 
 11:  Atlético Madrid: 1968, 1976, 1977, 1978, 1991, 1995, 1997, 2003, 2014, 2015, 2022
 9:  Cádiz: 1981, 1983, 1985, 1986, 1993, 1994, 2006, 2011, 2021
 7:  Sevilla: 1955, 1956, 1957, 2004, 2008, 2013
 6:  Real Madrid: 1958, 1959, 1960, 1966, 1970, 1982
 6:  Real Betis: 1964, 1999, 2000, 2001, 2007, 2018
 3:  Barcelona: 1961, 1962, 2005
 3:  Palmeiras: 1969, 1974, 1975
 3:  Vasco da Gama: 1987, 1988, 1989
 2:  Benfica: 1963, 1971
 2:  Flamengo: 1979, 1980
 2:  Espanyol: 1973, 2010
 2:  Athletic Bilbao Women: 2019, 2021 
 1:  Zaragoza: 1965
 1:  Valencia: 1967
 1:  Athletic Bilbao: 1972
 1:  Sporting Gijón: 1984
 1:  Atlético Mineiro: 1990
 1:  São Paulo: 1992
 1:  Corinthians: 1996
 1:  Deportivo La Coruña: 1998
 1:  Mallorca: 2002
 1:  Nacional: 2012
 1:  Málaga: 2016
 1:  Las Palmas: 2017

Top goalscorers

References

External links 
Historia y Origen, Cádiz CF (20 November 2012).
 Raúl Torre: Trofeo Ramón de Carranza (Cádiz-Spain) 1955–2008, Rec.Sport.Soccer Statistics Foundation, 9 July 2009

Spanish football friendly trophies
Cádiz CF
1955 establishments in Spain
Women's football competitions in Spain
Sport in Cádiz